Kristýna Leichtová (born 14 September 1985 in Plzeň, Czechoslovakia) is a Czech actress. She appeared in the films Účastníci zájezdu, Hostel, Bastardi, and in the TV series Světla pasáže and Comeback.

Filmography 
"Comeback" (2008) TV series ... Iva Pacovská (2008-2010)
"Soukromé pasti" (2008) TV series ... Sofie (episode 1x10 Easy and quickly e-wife)
"Světla pasáže" (2007) TV series ... Kateřina Moravcová
Účastníci zájezdu (2006) ... Denisa
Žralok v hlavě (2005) ... Girl
Hostel (2003) ... ???

Theatre

Stavovské divadlo, Prague 
Stísněná 22 ....
Top Girls .... Kit, waitress (2004-2005)

Divadlo Ta Fantastika 
Němcová (2008) .... Barbora, Viktorka, Dorotka, Eliška and White Lady
The Picture of Dorian Gray (2006) .... Sibylla Vane

Divadlo Na Zábradlí 
Včas milovat, včas umírat .... ??? (2004-2005)
Gazdina roba .... Poluša (2004)

Theatre of Conservatory 
Ťululum (2005) .... Maggy Soldignac
Milujeme křečky (2006)
Krvavá svatba (2006) .... neighbour
Piknik (2006) .... Millie Owens

Another Stage Works 
Zadržitelný vzestup Artura Uie .... Daisy (2002) (Divadlo Komedie)
Král jelenem .... Deer (Divadlo Na Vinohradech)
Kebab (2007-2012) .... Madalina (Strašnické divadlo)
P.R.S.A. .... Kristýna, Eva's Daughter

Personal life 
She studied of Conservatory and DAMU in Prague. Her hobbies: swimming, skiing, creeping of wall. She has five young siblings.

References

External links 

 Kristýna Leichtová at ČSFD

1985 births
Living people
Actors from Plzeň
Czech film actresses
Czech stage actresses
Czech television actresses
21st-century Czech actresses
Prague Conservatory alumni